Winners of the Wilderness is a 1927 American silent war drama film directed by W.S. Van Dyke and starring Tim McCoy and Joan Crawford.  In this costume drama, set during the French and Indian War (1754-1763),  Rene Contrecouer (Crawford), the daughter of a French general falls for a soldier of fortune (McCoy). The film was photographed mostly in black and white, but one scene was in color by Technicolor.

Cast
Tim McCoy – Colonel Sir Dennis O'Hara
Joan Crawford – Rene Contrecoeur
Edward Connelly – General Contrecoeur
Roy D'Arcy – Captain Dumas
Louise Lorraine – Mimi
Edward Hearn – General George Washington
Tom O'Brien – Timothy
Will Walling – General Edward Braddock
Frank Currier – Governor de Vaudreuil
Lionel Belmore – Governor Dinwiddie of Virginia
Chief John Big Tree – Chief Pontiac

Crew
 David Townsend - Set Designer

References

External links

Winners of the Wilderness; allmovie.com

1927 films
1920s war drama films
1920s color films
American silent feature films
American black-and-white films
French and Indian War films
Metro-Goldwyn-Mayer films
Silent films in color
American war drama films
1927 drama films
1920s English-language films
1920s American films
Silent American drama films
Silent war drama films